JJ Aldrich (born September 29, 1992) is an American mixed martial artist who competes in the Flyweight division. She is currently signed with the Ultimate Fighting Championship and has fought for Invicta FC.

Background 
Aldrich was born to a homeless single mother in Denver, Colorado. She grew up in homeless shelters with her mother and older sister, her father had gone to prison before she was born. Years later, Aldrich's mother established a childcare business which allowed the family to move out of the shelter. When JJ was nine, her mother brought the sisters to taekwondo classes at a local recreation center and by the age of thirteen JJ had already earned her black belt. Around those times, Aldrich's taekwondo teachers introduced her to the mixed martial arts gym – 303 Training Center – where she has been training to this day.

Aldrich is of Irish Ancestry.

Mixed martial arts career

Amateur career
In 2010 Aldrich began looking for amateur bouts, eventually capturing several amateur titles in various organizations. During her amateur career she faced future UFC athletes like Raquel Pennington, Kailin Curran and Rachael Ostovich.

Invicta 
JJ Aldrich made her professional MMA career on September 6, 2014, at Invicta FC 8: Waterson vs. Tamada and she won the fight via unanimous decision (30-27, 30–27, 30–26).

Her next fight come one year later on February 27, 2015, at Invicta FC 11: Cyborg vs. Tweet, against  Jamie Moyle where she lost in round one via rear-naked choke.

Aldrich was scheduled to face Daniela Kortmann on September 12, 2015,  at Invicta FC 14: Evinger vs. Kianzad; however Kortmann was forced to pull from the card due to visa issue and was replaced by  Rosa Acevedo. She won the fight via first-round knockout.

The Ultimate Fighter 
JJ Aldrich was a contestant on The Ultimate Fighter: Team Joanna vs. Team Cláudia. In the competition, Aldrich defeated Kristi Lopez by unanimous decision in the elimination round, then lost in the quarterfinals to Tatiana Suarez in round 2 by submission via rear-naked choke.

Freestyle Cage Fighting 
Aldrich faced Kathina Caton in September 2016 at Freestyle Cage Fighting 53. She won the fight in round one via technical knockout.

Return to Invicta 
Aldrich faced Lynn Alvarez on November 18, 2016, at Invicta FC: Evinger vs. Kunitskaya and she defeated Alvarez via unanimous decision.

Ultimate Fighting Championship 
She signed with the UFC to fight Juliana Lima for UFC Fight Night: Lewis vs. Abdurakhimov in Albany, New York on December 9, 2016. Aldrich was a late replacement for Lima's original opponent, Tatiana Suarez, who had to pull out of the bout due to injury. She lost the fight via unanimous decision.

Aldrich faced South Korean fighter Chan-Mi Jeon in Jeon's UFC debut for UFC Fight Night: Lewis vs. Hunt in Auckland, New Zealand on June 11, 2017. She won the fight via unanimous decision.

Aldrich faced Danielle Taylor on January 14, 2018, at UFC Fight Night: Stephens vs. Choi. She won the fight via unanimous decision.

Aldrich faced Polyana Viana on August 4, 2018, at UFC 227. She won the fight via unanimous decision.

Aldrich returned to flyweight to face Maycee Barber at UFC Fight Night: Thompson vs. Pettis on March 23, 2019. Aldrich lost the fight via technical knockout in round two.

Aldrich faced Lauren Mueller on October 12, 2019, at UFC on ESPN+ 19 She won the fight via unanimous decision.

Aldrich faced Sabina Mazo on January 18, 2020, at UFC 246. She lost the fight by split decision.

Aldrich faced Cortney Casey on Mach 13, 2021 at UFC Fight Night 187. She won the fight by split decision.

Aldrich was scheduled to face Tracy Cortez on August 28, 2021, at UFC on ESPN 30. However, Cortez was pulled from the fight due to injury, and she was replaced by Vanessa Demopoulos. Aldrich won the fight via unanimous decision.

Aldrich was scheduled to face  Ariane Lipski on March 12, 2022, at UFC Fight Night 203. However, Lipski was removed from her match for undisclosed reasons, and she was replaced by Gillian Robertson. She won the fight via unanimous decision.

Aldrich faced Erin Blanchfield on June 4, 2022, at UFC Fight Night 207. She lost the bout via guillotine choke in the second round.

Aldrich faced Ariane Lipski on March 11, 2023 at UFC Fight Night 221. She lost the fight via unanimous decision.

Championships and accomplishments

Mixed martial arts

Amateur championships
2014 – Conflict MMA flyweight champion
2013 – Sparta Combat League (SCL) Amateur flyweight champion
2012 / 2013 – Destiny MMA Amateur flyweight champion

Mixed martial arts record

|-
|Loss
|align=center|11–6
|Ariane Lipski
|Decision (unanimous)
|UFC Fight Night: Yan vs. Dvalishvili
|
|align=center|3
|align=center|5:00
|Las Vegas, Nevada, United States
|
|-
|Loss
|align=center|11–5
|Erin Blanchfield
|Submission (guillotine choke)
|UFC Fight Night: Volkov vs. Rozenstruik
|
|align=center|2
|align=center|2:38
|Las Vegas, Nevada, United States
|
|-
|Win
|align=center|11–4
|Gillian Robertson
|Decision (unanimous)
|UFC Fight Night: Santos vs. Ankalaev
|
|align=center|3
|align=center|5:00
|Las Vegas, Nevada, United States
|
|-
|Win
|align=center|10–4
|Vanessa Demopoulos
|Decision (unanimous)
|UFC on ESPN: Barboza vs. Chikadze
|
|align=center|3
|align=center|5:00
|Las Vegas, Nevada, United States
|
|-
|Win
|align=center|9–4
|Cortney Casey
|Decision (split)
|UFC Fight Night: Edwards vs. Muhammad
|
|align=center|3
|align=center|5:00
|Las Vegas, Nevada, United States
|
|-
|Loss
|align=center|8–4
|Sabina Mazo
|Decision (split)
|UFC 246 
|
|align=center|3
|align=center|5:00
|Las Vegas, Nevada, United States
|
|-
|Win
|align=center|8–3
|Lauren Mueller
|Decision (unanimous)
|UFC Fight Night: Joanna vs. Waterson 
|
|align=center|3
|align=center|5:00
|Tampa, Florida, United States
|
|-
|Loss
|align=center|7–3
|Maycee Barber
|TKO (knee and punches) 
|UFC Fight Night: Thompson vs. Pettis 
|
|align=center|2 	
|align=center|3:01 
|Nashville, Tennessee, United States
|
|-
|Win
|align=center|7–2
|Polyana Viana
|Decision (unanimous)
|UFC 227 
|
|align=center|3
|align=center|5:00
|Los Angeles, California, United States
|
|-
|Win
|align=center|6–2
|Danielle Taylor
|Decision (unanimous)
|UFC Fight Night: Stephens vs. Choi
|
|align=center|3
|align=center|5:00
|St. Louis, Missouri, United States
|
|-
|Win
|align=center|5–2
|Jeon Chan-mi
|Decision (unanimous)
|UFC Fight Night: Lewis vs. Hunt
|
|align=center|3
|align=center|5:00
|Auckland, New Zealand
|
|-
|Loss
|align=center|4–2
|Juliana Lima
|Decision (unanimous)
|UFC Fight Night: Lewis vs. Abdurakhimov
|
|align=center|3
|align=center|5:00
|Albany, New York, United States
|
|-
| Win
| align=center| 4–1
| Lynn Alvarez
| Decision (unanimous)
| Invicta FC 20: Evinger vs. Kunitskaya
| 
| align=center| 3
| align=center| 5:00
| Kansas City, Missouri, United States
|
|-
| Win
| align=center| 3–1
| Kathina Catron
| TKO (punches)
| FCF 53
| 
| align=center| 1
| align=center| 3:01
| Tulsa, Oklahoma, United States
|
|-
| Win
| align=center| 2–1
| Rosa Acevedo
| KO (knee and punches)
| Invicta FC 14: Evinger vs. Kianzad
| 
| align=center| 1
| align=center| 2:24
| Kansas City, Missouri, United States
| 
|-
| Loss
| align=center| 1–1
| Jamie Moyle
| Technical Submission (rear-naked choke)
| Invicta FC 11: Cyborg vs. Tweet
| 
| align=center| 1
| align=center| 2:20
| Los Angeles, California, United States
| 
|-
| Win
| align=center| 1–0
| Delaney Owen
| Decision (unanimous)
| Invicta FC 8: Waterson vs. Tamada
| 
| align=center| 3
| align=center| 5:00
| Davenport, Iowa, United States
|
|-

See also
 List of female mixed martial artists

References

External links
 
 

1992 births
American practitioners of Brazilian jiu-jitsu
Female Brazilian jiu-jitsu practitioners
Mixed martial artists from Colorado
Living people
Flyweight mixed martial artists
Strawweight mixed martial artists
American female mixed martial artists
Mixed martial artists utilizing taekwondo
Mixed martial artists utilizing Brazilian jiu-jitsu
American female taekwondo practitioners
Sportspeople from Denver
American people of Irish descent
Ultimate Fighting Championship female fighters
21st-century American women